Hostage: Missing Celebrity is a 2021 South Korean reality action thriller film, written and directed by Pil Kam-sung for Next Entertainment World. It is a feature debut of director and is based on 2015 Chinese film Saving Mr. Wu. Starring Hwang Jung-min, the film is about kidnapping of Korean top film star Hwang Jung-min by strangers. First he thinks it is a prank, then he soon realises that it is no joke, as the kidnappers demand from him a huge amount of ransom within 24 hours. The film with production cost of 8 billion was ready for release in 2020 but its release was postponed due to the resurgence of the COVID-19 pandemic. 

Hostage: Missing Celebrity was theatrically released on August 18, 2021. , it is the third highest-grossing Korean film of 2021, with gross of US$13.07 million and 1.63 million admissions.

Synopsis
After a film premiere, a famous actor is kidnapped in the middle of Seoul. Thinking it is a prank, the actor is relaxed, but when he faces cruelty, he realizes the gravity of the situation. He tries to find an escape route as kidnappers demand a huge ransom within 24 hours. Then the struggle begins, which is very different from what he has seen in films.

Cast
 Hwang Jung-min as Hwang Jung-min, a Korean top film star who is taken hostage by five people
 Kim Jae-beom as Choi Ki-wan
 Lee Yoo-mi as Ban So-yeon
 Ryu Kyung-soo Yeom Dong-hun 
 Jung Jae-won as Yong-Tae
 Lee Kyu-won as Go Young-rok
 Lee Ho-jung as Saet-byeol
 Baek Joo-hee as Detective Oh
 Special appearance
 Park Sung-woong as 'Brother'

Production
The film is remake of 2015 Chinese film Saving Mr. Wu. It is a reality action film in which actor Hwang Jung-min is playing himself. In a press conference Hwang Jung-min said, "I think it would be easy to play myself, but it is rather difficult to reveal myself." He further said, "I think the audience enjoyed the situation where Hwang Jung-min and Hwang Jung-min coexist in a movie more realistically." The film was shot in idle area of the military base in Gandong-myeon, Hwacheon-gun, Donghae Police Station, and around Namsan-myeon and Sabuk-myeon in Chuncheon.

Release
The film was released on August 18, 2021, on 1289 screens.

The film was officially invited to the US Fantastic Fest, a genre film festival held from 23 to September 30, 2021 in Austin, Texas, United States.

Hostage: Missing Celebrity was invited to 41st Hawaii International Film Festival in 'Spotlight on Korea' (Korean film sector) section. The festival was  held in Hawaii, USA, from November 4 to November 28, 2021. It has  also been invited at 16th Paris Korean Film Festival, which will be held from October 26 to November 2. It was showcased in 'Evenement' section of the festival program. In April 2022 it was invited at the 24th edition of Far East Film Festival at Udine held from April 22 to 30 2022.

Reception

Box office
According to the Korea Film Council's integrated computer network data, the film ranked number 1 at the Korean box office by recording 97,097 audience on its opening day. Maintaining its top position at Korean box office for the second third and fourth day, it recorded 1 million cumulative audiences on 10h day of its release, thereby becoming the 3rd Korean film of 2021 to cross 1 million mark. 

 it is at 3rd place among all the Korean films released in the year 2021, with gross of US$13.07 million and 1,638,437 admissions.

Critical response
Lee Yu-na reviewing the film for YTN praised the debutant director Phil Gam-seong for his apt handling of the film and Hwang Jung-min for his performance. Yu-na opened the review writing, "A film with a simple plot wins with Hwang Jung-min's unrivaled acting skills. In terms of completeness, it is a masterpiece that never lags behind among the tentpole films this summer." She opined that the film has 'heightened the reality' by portraying Hwang Jung-min's character as himself.

Kim Mi-hwa reviewing for Star News wrote that the film is from a new genre of 'reality action' setting where the main actor is acting himself. Praising the direction of Phil Gam-seong, she said, "Even though it is a feature film by a new director, it does not stop breathing and boasts a smooth flow." Praising the performance of Hwang Jung-min in reality action setting, Mi-hwa opined, "As Hwang Jung-min said, if you watch the movie, you will find yourself cheering for him." She concluded, "Just seeing the discovery of new actors is enough reason to watch Hostage: Missing Celebrity."

Kim Ji-won of Ten Asia opened the review writing, "The movie Hostage: Missing Celebrity took the reality of 'acting veteran Hwang Jung-min' as the setting of the movie. Realism and fiction are properly blended to bring out a high level of immersion." Ji-won praised the performance of new actors and opined that this ensemble as hostage-takers has added to the sublimity of the film. Analysing the depth of reality and fiction in the reality-action film, she wrote that narrative of the film was well ordered and Hwang Jung-min's acting kept the watchers engrossed in the film. She wrote, "It [the film] also has the virtues of an entertainment movie with unrefined realistic action scenes and quick control through appropriate screen transitions."

Park Jeong-seon of JTBC wrote that the reality-action of the film made it appealing and kept the audience engrossed. She gave credit of this to director Phil Gam-seong and opined, "The realistic direction of director also played a big part in this reality." She praised the performance of lead actor and the cast of new actors, as she wrote, "Although they are newcomers who are still unfamiliar with the screen, they each do their job well." Park opined that though the production cost of the film is just about 8 billion won, still "[..] the best possible content was created." Park concluded, "It is a wise film that is well suited to current theaters and audiences."

Awards and nominations

References

External links
 
 
 
 

2020s Korean-language films
Films postponed due to the COVID-19 pandemic
2021 films
South Korean thriller films
Next Entertainment World films
Films about kidnapping
Films about actors
2021 thriller films